This is a list of episodes for the sixth season of Everybody Loves Raymond.

Production 
On January 22, 2001, it was revealed CBS was about to sign with HBO and Worldwide Pants to renew Everybody Loves Raymond for two more seasons; creator Philip Rosenthal explained that he and star Ray Romano also planned for the seventh season to be the show's last, as "I never saw a show get better after seven years." Starting the sixth season, Heaton was paid $250,000 per episode.

Cast

Main 
Ray Romano as Raymond "Ray" Barone
Patricia Heaton as Debra (née Whelan) Barone
Brad Garrett as Robert Barone
Doris Roberts as Marie Barone
Peter Boyle as Francis "Frank" Barone
 Madylin Sweeten as Alexandra "Ally" Barone
Sawyer Sweeten and Sullivan Sweeten as Geoffrey Barone and Michael Barone

Supporting 
 Monica Horan as Amy McDougall
 Andy Kindler as Andy
 Jon Manfrellotti as Gianni 
 Tom McGowan as Bernie Gruenfelder
 Alex Meneses as Stefania Fogagnolo
 David Proval as Marco Fogagnolo
 Katherine Helmond as Lois Whelan 
 Robert Culp as Warren Whelan

 Charles Durning as Father Hubley
 Victor Raider-Wexler as Stan
 Len Lesser as Garvin
 Fred Stoller as Gerard
 Amy Aquino as Peggy
 Alexandra Romano as Molly
 Max Rosenthal as Max
 Debra Mooney as Lee
 David Hunt as Bill Parker
 Elizabeth Anne Smith as Eileen

Ratings 
In the sixth season, Everybody Loves Raymond increased its average viewers from 21 million in 2000 to 22 million, performing better than usual in viewership; according to network executives and Rosenthal, this was the result of the September 11 attacks, as families wanted to be comforted by seeing familiar characters in shows devoid of current event themes.

Reviews 
Everybody Loves Raymond topped lists of best fall 2001 series from the Daily Herald and the Orlando Sentinel. The Daily Herald claimed that "every episode has been daring, bold and, above all, hilarious," and the Sentinel stated that "no series had more winning episodes this fall." "The Angry Family" and "Marie's Sculpture" were highlighted in both lists, with "Older Women" highlighted in Sentinel's and "Raybert" praised by the Herald as a new take on a "stale" sitcom setup.

Episodes

References

2001 American television seasons
2002 American television seasons
Everybody Loves Raymond seasons